Real Vicenza V.S. is an Italian football club based in Vicenza, Veneto region. The club concentrated in youth football since the 2015–16 season.

History

Foundation 
The club was founded in 2010 after the merger of the teams Leodari Sole, Cavazzale and Real Vicenza-Laghetto.

Serie D 
At the end of the 2011–12 season the team was promoted from Eccellenza Veneto/A to Serie D after playoffs.

Lega Pro 
After only one season in the Girone C of the Serie D league, ended in fifth place, Real Vicenza opted to apply for repechage to Lega Pro Seconda Divisione, the bottom level of Italian professional football, to fill any potential vacancies. The application was accepted on 5 August 2013, and Real Vicenza was successfully admitted into Lega Pro Seconda Divisione, with only one tier behind historical main local club Vicenza Calcio (who were relegated to Lega Pro Prima Divisione on the same season). In the 2013–14 season, a transitional one from a two-tier to a single-tier Lega Pro system, Real Vicenza managed to ensure a place for the inaugural season of the unified third division, the 2014–15 Lega Pro.

Colours and badge 
The team's colours are white and red.

Honours
Coppa Italia Veneto:
Winner (1): 2011–12

References

External links
Official website 

Football clubs in Italy
Association football clubs established in 2010
Serie C clubs
Sport in Vicenza
Companies based in Vicenza
Football clubs in Veneto
2010 establishments in Italy